The Nord 1500 Noréclair was a prototype French twin-engined dive bomber and anti-submarine warfare aircraft built at the end of the Second World War. It would have carried both torpedoes, missiles, and bombs. The aircraft was built in response to a need for a dive bomber and anti-submarine aircraft that could be launched both from land and from an aircraft carrier. The first prototype flew on 29 August 1947. The tests revealed many issues that had to be resolved. Eventually the project was abandoned after being criticized heavily and discovering many problems.

Specifications

References

1940s French bomber aircraft
Nord aircraft